Anton Ferdinand Schaller (6 March 1773 – 26 September 1844) was an Austrian painter in the Classical style.

Biography 
Schaller was born and died in Vienna. His father was a lathe operator at the Imperial State Porcelain Manufactory. His younger brother, Johann Nepomuk, became a sculptor.

He also served as an apprentice at the Manufactory, where his drawing skills were recognized by its Director, Matthäus von Niedermayer, about whom little is known, other than his corporate practices. After Anton was awarded a prize for an oil painting of a scene from Iphigenia in Tauris, by Goethe, Niedermayer commissioned him to create porcelain designs based on historical paintings. From 1801 to 1807, he worked as the first figure painter at the Manufactory. 

At that time, he developed an unspecified nervous disorder that prevented him from working until 1818. The following year, he became a "" at the Academy's painting and sculpture school.

In addition to his professional work, he did numerous drawing studies of nature and anatomy. In 1831, this led to an appointment as Professor of anatomical drawing at the Academy. From that point on, most of his energies were devoted to teaching, with an occasional oil painting, mostly on historical themes. Later, he became a member of the Academy. He also wrote essays on art, to accompany his classes; some of which have been published in several editions.

Sources 
 Schaller, Anton. In: Georg Kaspar Nagler: Neues allgemeines Künstler-Lexicon, Band 15, Verlag von E. A. Fleischmann, München 1845, S. 138–139

External links 

1773 births
1844 deaths
Austrian painters
History painters
Ceramics decorators
Academic staff of the Academy of Fine Arts Vienna
Artists from Vienna